Episcopal Church of the Ascension and Manse is a historic church at 1101 and 1109 Eleventh Street in Wellsville, Ohio.

It was built in 1870 in a Vernacular Gothic Revival style and added to the National Register of Historic Places in 1986.

References

Episcopal churches in Ohio
Churches on the National Register of Historic Places in Ohio
Carpenter Gothic church buildings in Ohio
Churches completed in 1870
19th-century Episcopal church buildings
Buildings and structures in Columbiana County, Ohio
National Register of Historic Places in Columbiana County, Ohio